is a former Japanese football player.

Inoue spent most of his career playing for Ehime FC in the J2 League.

Club statistics

References

External links

1982 births
Living people
Chukyo University alumni
Association football people from Ehime Prefecture
Japanese footballers
J2 League players
Japan Football League players
Ehime FC players
Association football midfielders